Villalobos is a Spanish  surname (meaning town of wolves) and common  in Spain, Portugal, Latin America, and Italy

Villalobos is a city in the province of Zamora in Spain which derives its name from Spanish villa "town" and lobos "wolves". The element villa was used for someone who lived in a village, as opposed to an isolated farmhouse or in the town. The word was later used of a group of houses forming a settlement. Surnames derived from place-names are divided into two broad categories; topographic names and habitation names. Topographic names are derived from general descriptive references to someone who lived near a physical feature such as an oak tree, a hill, a stream or a church. Habitation names are derived from pre-existing names denoting towns, villages and farmsteads. Other classes of local names include those derived from the names of rivers, individual houses with signs on them, regions and whole countries. In the 8th century, Spain fell under the control of the Moors, and this influence, which lasted into the 12th century, has also left its mark on Hispanic surnames. A few names are based directly on Arabic personal names. The majority of Spanish occupational and nickname surnames, however, are based on ordinary Spanish derivatives. In Spain identifying patronymics are to be found as early as the mid-9th century, but these changed with each generation, and hereditary surnames seem to have come in slightly later in Spain than in England and France. As well as the names of the traditional major saints of the Christian Church, many of the most common Spanish surnames are derived from personal names of Germanic origin. For the most part these names are characteristically Hispanic. They derive from the language of the Visigoths, who controlled Spain between the mid-5th and early 8th centuries.

Arts, music, and letters
Carlos Villalobos (born 1975), American composer and musician
Carmen Villalobos (born 1983), Colombian actress
Gina Villalobos (born 1970), American singer-songwriter (daughter of Reynaldo, below)
Heitor Villa-Lobos (1887–1959), Brazilian classical composer
Horacio Villalobos (born 1970), Mexican TV host and actor
Ligiah Villalobos (first credit 2000), Mexican-American film producer 
Lupe Vélez, full name Guadalupe Villalobos Vélez (1908–1944), Mexican film actress
Osmariel Villalobos (born1988), Venezuelan TV show host and Miss Earth Venezuela 2011
Reynaldo Villalobos (born 1940), American cinematographer and director (father of Gina, above)
Ricardo Villalobos (born 1970), Chilean-German DJ and music producer
Yadhira Carrillo, full name Yadhira Carrillo Villalobos (born 1972), Mexican actress

Athletes
Alberth Villalobos (born 1995), Costa Rican footballer
Benji Villalobos (born 1988), Salvadoran footballer
Enrique Villalobos (born 1965), Spanish basketball player
Gregorio Villalobos (born 1944), Mexican footballer
Josh Villalobos (born 1985), Puerto Rican footballer
Manuel Villalobos (born 1980), Chilean footballer
Pablo Villalobos (born 1979), Spanish long-distance runner
Saúl Villalobos (born 1991), Mexican footballer

Politics, law, and government
Celia Villalobos (born 1949), Spanish politician
J. Alex Villalobos (born 1963), American politician (grandson of Lolo, below)
Joaquín Villalobos (born 1951), Salvadoran politician
José Ángel Córdova Villalobos (born 1953), Mexican politician
Juan Henríquez de Villalobos (1630–1689), Spanish soldier and governor of Chile
Lolo Villalobos (1913–1997), Cuban politician (grandfather of J. Alex, above)
Nervis Villalobos, Venezuelan politician
Ruy López de Villalobos (1500–1544), Spanish explorer
Sergio Villalobos (born 1930), Chilean historian

Other
Francisco López de Villalobos, (1474-1549), Spanish physician and author
Francisco Raúl Villalobos Padilla (born 1921), Mexican Roman Catholic bishop
Maria Cristina Villalobos, American mathematician
Román Arrieta Villalobos (1924–2004), Costa Rican Roman Catholic archbishop

Fictional people
 Esmeralda Villalobos, fictional character in the film Pulp Fiction

== See also ==

 Villalobos (disambiguation)

Spanish-language surnames

de:Villalobos